Peter Booth served in the Arkansas House of Representatives in 1893. He represented Jefferson County, Arkansas and was one of at least four African Americans in the Arkansas House of Representatives in 1893 along with George W. Bell in the Arkansas State Senate. State government was dominated by Democrats at the time. In 1917, a Daily Arkansas Gazette article mocked him and his service, relishing that he was then working as shoe shine attendant at the state house. According to the article, he introduced legislation related to providing more time for Australian ballot voting.

References

Year of birth missing
Year of death missing
Members of the Arkansas House of Representatives
African-American state legislators in Arkansas
People from Jefferson County, Arkansas